Colonia Itapebí is a hamlet in the Salto Department of Uruguay.

References 

Populated places in the Salto Department